The Chassidim Shul also known as the Chabad House is a synagogue in Yeoville, Johannesburg, South Africa built in 1963 and designed by the firm of Morgensten & Morgensten, the husband and wife team of Jacques Morgenstern and Riva Morgenstern. They met at the University of the Witwatersrand in the Department of Architecture in the 1940s and ran a successful and award-winning architectural practice in Johannesburg.

The cornerstone was laid in 1963 by Mr Henry Jacobson, in memory of his parents, long-standing members of the Chassidic community. The building committee included Rabbi Aloy, obm, Mr Shaul Bacher, obm, Mr Mitzie Yachad and others. The Shul was finished about a year later.

The Chassidim Shul served as a place of worship and study and other activities of Chabad-Lubavitch. It was famous for its Shabbat farbrengens and extraordinary Chassidic joy and dancing on Simchat Torah.

Almost every Rabbi who is today a congregational leader was once a young man or a bochur at the Chassidim Shul. In retrospect “that little shul in Yeoville” has proven to be a powerful engine that changed the face of Jewish South Africa. It brought Yiddishkeit, Lubavitch and the Rebbe into the hearts of literally thousands of Jews through the establishment of more than a dozen Chabad shuls in Johannesburg, Natal and the Cape.

Sadly, with the change in demographics in Yeoville it is no longer in use as a Synagogue.

Design
A beautiful building, Chassidim Shul's modern and distinctive design was ahead of its time:

It is notable externally for its vigorous, sculptural nature. The roof is a heavy V-shape protecting the simple shape of the building which consists of an enclosure by screens of different density and transparency – warm-coloured stone and modelled grilles and facings in terrazzo by the sculptor Eduardo Villa.

The mystic lions of brass and bronze over the Holy Ark inside the building were also by Villa but these have since be removed. Villa worked on a number of Morgenstern and Morgenstern's other buildings.

Heritage Status
Chassidim Shul is recognised as an important heritage asset for the following reasons:
 Chassidim Shul has a distinctive stylized facade, making it a high quality 1960s landmark building
 Chassidim Shul's combines local stone construction with modern grilles in a unique manner
 Association with the Chassidic community of Johannesburg
 Association with Morgenstern & Morgenstern, Jewish Architectural practice

References

Ashkenazi Jewish culture in South Africa
Synagogues in South Africa
Jews and Judaism in Johannesburg
Religious buildings and structures in Johannesburg
Heritage Buildings in Johannesburg